

Major events
May 19 (May 8 in the Julian calendar), 1713 — the capital of Russia was moved from Moscow to St. Petersburg.
July 28 (17), 1713 — Riga Governorate was formed on the recently acquired lands in the north-west of Russia.
July 28 (17), 1713 — Smolensk Governorate was abolished; its territory was divided between Moscow and Riga Governorates.

Subdivisions (as of 1713)
Archangelgorod Governorate (Архангелогородская губерния)
Subdivided into 18.5 lots.
Azov Governorate (Азовская губерния)
Subdivided into 7.5 lots.
Kazan Governorate (Казанская губерния)
Subdivided into 21 lots.
Kiev Governorate (Киевская губерния)
Subdivided into 5 lots.
Moscow Governorate (Московская губерния)
Subdivided into lots.
Riga Governorate (Рижская губерния)
Subdivided into lots.
St. Petersburg Governorate (Санкт-Петербургская губерния)
Subdivided into 32.2 lots.
Siberian Governorate (Сибирская губерния)
Subdivided into 9 lots.

1713
1710s in Russia